Anthony Catanzaro (born December 18, 1970) is an American male fitness model, training consultant and bodybuilder.

Personal life
He was born in Bay Shore, New York, U.S., on Long Island and now lives in New York City.

Career

Print
Catanzaro has been modeling for numerous magazines and has appeared in training videos and fitness/training magazines such as Exercise, Playgirl (January 2001 centerfold), Fitness Magazine, Health & Fitness, Natural Bodybuilding, Muscle & Fitness, Fitness Plus, Men’s Exercise and Exercise for Men Only.

TV appearances
He has appeared in TV shows like Maury, Ricki, Donahue, Good Day New York and Saturday Night Live as well as in films like Carlito's Way, The Scout, Batman: Gothic and the independent film, Beef. He was a contestant on the Oxygen model search reality television program ''Mr. Romance.

Bodybuilding
Catanzaro is a successful competitive bodybuilder with titles including Natural Bodybuilding Middleweight Champion (1998), NPC New York State Middleweight winner (2002), INBF Tournament of Champions Middleweight Champion (2001) and  INBF Natural NYC Middle Weight Champion (2005).

See also
 List of male underwear models

References

1970 births
Living people
American bodybuilders
Male models from New York (state)
Sportspeople from New York City
Participants in American reality television series
Playgirl Men of the Month
People from Bay Shore, New York